Western calligraphy is the art of writing and penmanship
as practiced in the Western world, especially using the Latin alphabet (but also including calligraphic use of the Cyrillic and Greek alphabets, as opposed to "Eastern" traditions such as Turko-Perso-Arabic, Chinese or Indian calligraphy).

A contemporary definition of calligraphic practice is "the art of giving form to signs in an expressive, harmonious and skillful manner." The story of writing is one of aesthetic development framed within the technical skills, transmission speed(s) and material limitations of a person, time and place.

A style of writing is described as a script, hand or alphabet.

Calligraphy ranges from functional hand-lettered inscriptions and designs to fine art pieces where the abstract expression of the handwritten mark may or may not supersede the legibility of the letters. 
Classical calligraphy differs from typography and non-classical hand-lettering, though a calligrapher may create all of these; characters are historically disciplined yet fluid and spontaneous, improvised at the moment of writing.

Calligraphic writing continued to play a role long after the introduction of the printing press in the West, official documents being drawn up in engrossed or handwritten form well into the 18th century. 
A revival of calligraphy in the later 19th century was associated with the Art Nouveau and Arts and Crafts movements, and it continues to be practiced, typically commissioned for private purposes such as wedding invitations, logo design, memorial documents, etc.

History

Late Antiquity

Reed pens were replaced by quill pens.
 
 "A  is composed of many books; a book is of one scroll. It is called  by way of metaphor from the trunks of trees or vines, as if it were a wooden stock, because it contains in itself a multitude of books, as it were of branches."

A tradition of biblical manuscripts in  form goes back to the 2nd century, and from about the 5th century, two distinct styles of writing known as uncial and half-uncial (from the Latin , or 'inch') developed from various Roman bookhands.

Early Middle Ages

With the onset of the Middle Ages from about the 7th century, literacy in Latin Europe was increasingly limited to the monasteries.

The tradition of illumination has its origins in Late Antiquity, and reaches early medieval Europe in about the 8th century, notable early examples including the Book of Durrow, Lindisfarne Gospels and the Book of Kells.

Charlemagne's devotion to improved scholarship resulted in the recruiting of "a crowd of scribes", according to Alcuin, the Abbot of York. Alcuin developed the style known as the Caroline or Carolingian minuscule. The first manuscript in this hand was the Godescalc Evangelistary (finished 783) — a Gospel book written by the scribe Godescalc. Carolingian remains the one progenitor hand from which modern booktype descends.

Later Middle Ages

Blackletter (also known as Gothic) and its variation Rotunda, gradually developed from the Carolingian hand during the 12th century. Over the next three centuries, the scribes in northern Europe used an ever more compressed and spiky form of Gothic. Those in Italy and Spain preferred the rounder but still heavy-looking Rotunda. During the 15th century, Italian scribes returned to the Roman and Carolingian models of writing and designed the Italic hand, also called Chancery cursive, and Roman bookhand. These three hands — Gothic, Italic, and Roman bookhand — became the models for printed letters. Johannes Gutenberg used Gothic to print his famous Bible, but the lighter-weight Italic and Roman bookhand have since become the standard.

During the Middle Ages, hundreds of thousands of manuscripts were produced: some illuminated with gold and fine painting, some illustrated with line drawings, and some just textbooks.

Towards the end of the Middle Ages, administration in the states of Western Europe became more centralised. Paper was again widely available in Europe, which allowed a bureaucracy with standardized bookkeeping. In late medieval England, this led to the development of the Chancery Standard of Late Middle English, along with new forms of standardised calligraphy used for the production of legal or official documents.   By the mid-15th century, Chancery Standard was used for most official purposes except by the Church, which still used Latin, and for some legal purposes, for which Law French and some Latin were used. It was disseminated around England by bureaucrats on official business and slowly gained prestige. The production of finalized, calligraphic copies of documents in Chancery hand came to be known as "engrossing", from Anglo-French  (Old French  'in large (letters)').

In the late 1490s and early 1500s, the English bookprinting engineer Richard Pynson favored Chancery Standard in his published works, and consequently pushed the English spelling further towards standardization.

Early Modern era

In the mid-1600s French officials, flooded with documents written in various hands and varied levels of skill, complained that many such documents were beyond their ability to decipher.

While there were many great French masters at the time, the most influential in proposing these hands was Louis Barbedor, who published  circa 1650.

With the destruction of the  during the sack of Rome (1527), the capitol for writing masters moved to Southern France.

In England, Ayres and Banson popularized the Round Hand while Snell is noted for his reaction to them, and warnings of restraint and proportionality. Still Edward Crocker began publishing his copybooks 40 years before the aforementioned.

Modern revival

After printing became ubiquitous from the 15th century, the production of illuminated manuscripts began to decline. However, the rise of printing did not mean the end of calligraphy.

The modern revival of calligraphy began at the end of the 19th century, influenced by the aesthetics and philosophy of William Morris and the Arts and Crafts movement. Edward Johnston is regarded as being the father of modern calligraphy. 
After studying published copies of manuscripts by architect William Harrison Cowlishaw, he was introduced to William Lethaby in 1898, principal of the Central School of Arts and Crafts, who advised him to study manuscripts at the British Museum.

This triggered Johnston's interest in the art of calligraphy with the use of a broad edged pen. He began a teaching course in calligraphy at the Central School in Southampton Row, London from September 1899, where he influenced the typeface designer and sculptor Eric Gill. He was commissioned by  Frank Pick to design a new typeface for London Underground, still used today (with minor modifications).

He has been credited for reviving the art of modern penmanship and lettering single-handedly through his books and teachings - his handbook on the subject, Writing & Illuminating, & Lettering (1906) was particularly influential on a generation of British typographers and calligraphers, including Graily Hewitt, Stanley Morison, Eric Gill, Alfred Fairbank and Anna Simons. Johnston also devised the simply crafted round calligraphic handwriting style, written with a broad pen, known today as the Foundational hand, . Johnston initially taught his students an uncial hand using a flat pen angle, but later taught his hand using a slanted pen angle. He first referred to this hand as "Foundational Hand" in his 1909 publication, Manuscript & Inscription Letters for Schools and Classes and for the Use of Craftsmen.

20th century
Graily Hewitt taught at the Central School of Arts and Crafts and published together with Johnston throughout the early part of the century. Hewitt was central to the revival of gilding in calligraphy, and his prolific output on type design also appeared between 1915 and 1943. He is attributed with the  revival of  gilding with gesso and gold leaf on vellum. Hewitt helped to found the Society of Scribes & Illuminators (SSI) in 1921, probably the world's foremost calligraphy society.

Hewitt is not without both critics and supporters in his rendering of Cennino Cennini's medieval gesso recipes. Donald Jackson, a British calligrapher, has sourced his gesso recipes from earlier centuries a number of which are not presently in English translation. Graily Hewitt created the patent announcing the award to Prince Philip of the title of Duke of Edinburgh on November 19, 1947, the day before his marriage to Queen Elizabeth.

Johnston's pupil, Anna Simons, was instrumental in sparking off interest in calligraphy in Germany with her German translation of Writing and Illuminating, and Lettering in 1910. Austrian Rudolf Larisch, a teacher of lettering at the Vienna School of Art, published six lettering books that greatly influenced German-speaking calligraphers. Because German-speaking countries had not abandoned the Gothic hand in printing, Gothic also had a powerful effect on their styles.

Rudolf Koch was a friend and younger contemporary of Larisch. Koch's books, type designs, and teaching made him one of the most influential calligraphers of the 20th century in northern Europe and later in the U.S. Larisch and Koch taught and inspired many European calligraphers, notably Karlgeorg Hoefer, and Hermann Zapf.

Modern calligraphy

Calligraphy today finds diverse applications. These include graphic design, logo design, type design, paintings, scholarship, maps, menus, greeting cards, invitations, legal documents, diplomas, cut stone inscriptions, memorial documents, props and moving images for film and television, business cards, and handmade presentations. Many calligraphers make their livelihood in the addressing of envelopes and invitations for public and private events including wedding stationery. Entry points exist for both children and adults via classes and instruction books.

The scope of the calligraphic art is more than pure antiquarian interest. Johnston's legacy remains pivotal to the ambitions of perhaps most Western calligraphers:

It is possible even now to go back to the child's - something like the early calligrapher's - point of view, and this is the only healthy one for any fine beginning: to this nothing can be added; all Rules must give way to Truth and Freedom.

The multimillion-dollar Saint John's Bible project for the 21st century, completed in 2011, had engaged Donald Jackson with an international scriptorium. It is designed as a 21st-century illuminated Bible, executed with both ancient and modern tools and techniques. The earlier 20th-century "Bulley Bible" was executed by a student of Edward Johnston's, Edward Bulley.

The digital era has facilitated the creation and dissemination of thousands of new and historically styled fonts. Calligraphy gives unique expression to every individual letterform within a design layout which is not the strength of typeface technologies no matter their sophistication. The usefulness of the digital medium to the calligrapher is not limited to the computer layout of the new Saint John's Bible prior to working by hand. Graphics tablets facilitate calligraphic design work more than large size art pieces. The internet supports a number of online communities of calligraphers and hand lettering artists.

Other sub-styles

Other Western sub-styles and their respective century of appearance:
 Rustic capitals  (6th BC)
 Roman cursive  (6th BC)
 Roman square capitals  (6th BC)
 Uncial script  (2nd)
 Carolingian script  (7th)
 Beneventan script (8th)
 Visigothic script (9th)
 Gothic script (10th)
 Chancery hand (13th)
 Textura script (or Gutenberg script) (15th)
 Antiqua script (16th)
 English script (calligraphy) (18th)

Bibliography

Alexander, J.J.G., Marrow, J.H., & Sandler, L.F. with Moodey, E., & Petev, T.T. (2005) The Splendor of the Word: Medieval and Renaissance Illuminated Manuscripts at the New York Public Library. New York Public Library/ Harvey Miller Publishers
Backhouse, J. (1981) The Lindisfarne Gospels. Phaidon Press
Baines, P., & Dixon, C. (2003) Signs: lettering in the environment. Lawrence King Publishing
Bickham, G. (1743) The Universal Penman London. 1954 ed. Dover, New York
Bloem, M., & Browne, M. (2002) Colin McCahon: A Question of Faith. Craig Potton Publishing
Bose, S., & Jalal, A. (2003) Modern South Asia: History, Culture, Political Economy. Routledge, p. 36
British Library (2007). Collect Britain. Retrieved 22 February 2007.
Brown, M.P. & Lovett, P. (1999) The Historical Source Book for Scribes. British Library
Calderhead, C. (2005) Illuminating the Word: The Making of the Saint John's Bible. Liturgical Press
Cardozo Kindersley, L.L. (2007) The Cardozo Kindersley Workshop. Retrieved 15 April 2007.
Child, H. (1988) Calligraphy Today: Twentieth Century Tradition & Practice. Studio Books
Child, H. ed. (1986) The Calligrapher's Handbook. Taplinger Publishing Co.
Child, H. (1976) Calligraphy Today: A Survey of Tradition and Trends. Cassell & Collier Macmillan Publishers Ltd.
Child, H. (1963) Calligraphy Today: A Survey of Tradition and Trends. Watson-Guptill Publications
Cinamon, G. (2000) Rudolf Koch: Letterer, Type Designer, Teacher. Oak Knoll Press
Cockerell, S. (1945) from "Tributes to Edward Johnston" in Child, H. & Howes, J. ed.s (1986) Lessons in Formal Writing, pp. 21–30.
Daniels, P.T & Bright, W. (1996) The World's Writing Systems. Oxford University Press
de Hamel, C. (2001a) The Book: A History of the Bible. Phaidon Press
de Hamel, C (2001b) The British Library Guide to Manuscript Illumination. British Library
de Hamel, C. (1994) A History of Illuminated Manuscripts. Phaidon Press
de Hamel, C. (1992) Scribes and Illuminators. University of Toronto Press
Diringer, D. (1968) The Alphabet: A Key to the History of Mankind 3rd Ed. Volume 1 Hutchinson & Co. London
Fraser, M., & Kwiatowski, W. (2006) Ink and Gold: Islamic Calligraphy. Sam Fogg Ltd. London
Gaur, A. (2000) Literacy and the Politics of Writing. Intellect Books, p. 98
Geddes, A., & Dion, C. (2004) Miracle: a celebration of new life. Photogenique Publishers Auckland.
Gilderdale, P. (2006) "What's in a grip? A study of historical pen holds", Letter Arts Review 21(1): 10–27.
Gilderdale, P. (1999) "The Great Copperplate Myth", Letter Arts Review 15(1): 38–47.
Gray, N. (1986) A History of Lettering: Creative Experiment and Letter Identity. Godine
Gray, N. (1971) Lettering as Drawing: Part I The Moving Line. 1982 Ed. Taplinger Publishing C. New York
Green, R. (2003).  Bulley Bible (1969–83). Retrieved 28 October 2006.
Harris, D. (1991) Calligraphy: Inspiration, Innovation, Communication. Anaya, London.
Henning, W.E. (2002) An elegant hand: the golden age of American penmanship and calligraphy  ed. Melzer, P. Oak Knoll Press, New Castle, Delaware
Herringham, C.J. (transl. 1899) The Book of the Art of Cennino Cennini, an English translation from the Italian
Fairbank, Alfred, (1932) The Dryad Writing cards, The Dryad Press, Leicester
Fairbank, Alfred, (1932) A Handwriting Manual, The Dryad Press, Leicester
Fairbank, Alfred, (1975) Augustino da Siena, David R. Godine, Boston
Hewitt, W.G. (1944–1953). Letters of William Graily Hewitt to Sidney Feinberg. Retrieved 15 April 2007.
Hewitt, G. (1930) Lettering: For Students & Craftsmen. Pentalic 1976 ed.
International Typeface Corporation (1982) International Calligraphy Today.  Watson-Guptill Publ. New York
Jackson, D. (1981) The Story of Writing. The Calligraphy Centre
Johnston, E. (1906) Writing, Illuminating & Lettering. Dover Publication 1995 ed.
Johnston, E. (1909) Manuscript & Inscription Letters: For schools and classes and for the use of craftsmen, plate 6. San Vito Press & Double Elephant Press, 10th Impression
Kapr, A. (1991) "Calligraphy 91" in Schreibwerkstaat Klingspor Offenbach
Kerr, D.J. (2006) Amassing Treasures for All Times: Sir George Grey, Colonial Bookman and Collector. University of Otago Press/Oak Knoll Press
Knight, S. (1998) Historical Scripts: From Classical Times to the Renaissance. Oak Knoll Press
Knight, S. "The Roman Alphabet" in The World's Writing Systems (supra), pp. 312–332.
Lamb, C.M. ed. (1956) Calligrapher's Handbook. Pentalic 1976 ed.
Letter Arts Review
Luthra, H.L A Text Book of General Studies Vol II., p. 63
Mediavilla, C. (1996) Calligraphy. Scirpus Publications
Mitter, P. (2001) Indian Art. Oxford University Press, p. 100
Morris, W. (1882) From "Making the Best of It" in Hopes and Fears for Art. 2006 ed. Hard Press
Neugebauer, F. (1979) The Mystic Art of Written Forms
Pearce, C. (1981 and 2007) The Little Manual of Calligraphy - Paper and Ink Arts
Pearce, C. (1984) The Anatomy of Letters - Taplinger Publishing
Prestianni, J. (2001) Calligraphic Type Design in the Digital Age. Gingko Press
Pott, G. (2006) Kalligrafie: Intensiv Training Verlag Hermann Schmidt Mainz
Pott, G. (2005) Kalligrafie:Erste Hilfe und Schrift-Training mit Muster-Alphabeten Verlag Hermann Schmidt Mainz
Propfe, J. (2005) SchreibKunstRaume: Kalligraphie im Raum Callwey Verlag Munich
Reaves, M., & Schulte, E. (2006) Brush Lettering: An Instructional Manual in Western Brush Calligraphy Revised Edition, Design Books New York.
Renard, J. (1999) Responses to 101 Questions on Buddhism. Paulist Press. Religion / World, pp 23–24
Richardson, Marion, (1935) Writing and Writing patterns, Teachers book, Book, I, II, III, IV, V, and Cards, University Of London Press ltd.
Thomson, G. (2004) Digital Calligraphy with Photoshop. Thomson Learning
Tresser, J. (2006) The Technique of Raised Gilding 2nd Ed. CD-ROM
Trinity College Library Dublin (2006) The Book of Kells DVD-ROM.
Ver Berkmoes, R. Bali e Lombok p. 45
Walther, I.F., & Wolf, N. (2005) Masterpieces of Illumination: The world's most beautiful illuminated manuscripts from 400 to 1600. Taschen
Whitley, K.P. (2000) The History and Technique of Manuscript Gilding. Oak Knoll Press
Wieck, R.S. (1983) Late Medieval and Renaissance Illuminated Manuscripts 1350-1525 in the Houghton Library. Harvard College Library
Williams, R.B. (2004) Williams On South Asian Religions And Immigration: Collected Works By Raymond Brady Williams. Ashgate Publishing, Ltd., p. 61
Zapf, H. (2007) Alphabet Stories: A Chronicle of Technical Developments Cary Graphic Arts Press Rochester New York
Zapf, H. (2006) The world of Alphabets: A kaleidoscope of drawings and letterforms, CD-ROM

References

External links

Kaligrafos - The Dallas Calligraphy Society, Kaligrafos, a non-profit guild promoting the calligraphic arts
Friends of Calligraphy, San Francisco, California
New Zealand Calligraphers , a national network of affiliated calligraphy guilds
The Edward Johnston Foundation - Research centre for calligraphy and lettering arts